The Grenfell fossil site is a paleontological site of late Devonian age in the central west of New South Wales, Australia.  It was discovered in the late 1970s and lies near the town of Grenfell, some 370 km west of Sydney, and has been the subject of ongoing investigations by the Australian Museum.

The Grenfell site is important as the youngest locality for Devonian fossils in New South Wales, containing a diverse range of placoderm, acanthodian and sarcopterygian fishes.  The fossils are found in the Hunter Siltstone formation, of which there are extensive outcrops in the hills around Grenfell.  The fish are mainly disarticulated but not extensively damaged, indicating transport after death by running water for a short distance.

Fossil fauna
Sarcopterygians found include Eusthenodon gavini, Mandageria fairfaxi, Cabonnichthys burnsi, Yarimba thomsoni, Grenfellia meemanae and Holoptychius sp.  The placoderm genera Bothriolepis, Remigolepis, Groenlandaspis and Grenfellaspis are also present.

References

Notes

Sources
 

Devonian paleontological sites
Central West (New South Wales)
1970s in paleontology
Paleozoic paleontological sites of Australia
Paleontology in New South Wales